KICT may refer to:

 KICT-FM, a radio station (95.1 FM) licensed to Wichita, Kansas, United States
 The ICAO code for Wichita Dwight D. Eisenhower National Airport
 Karachi International Container Terminal, Pakistan